Shahnaz Pakravan ( born c. 1957) is a former British radio and television presenter.

Education 
Pakravan was educated at Moreton Hall School, a girls' independent boarding school in Oswestry, Shropshire, in England.

Broadcasting
Pakravan has worked for several leading news and current affairs channels:

BBC TV
She was a news presenter on BBC World and BBC News 24. She also produced and presented Arab World Direct for BBC World.

Channel Four
On Channel Four, she was the news anchor for the daily breakfast news and business programme Channel Four Daily. She was also the co-presenter of Channel 4 News, the channel's main evening prime-time bulletin.

Dubai TV
Pakravan has been a familiar face in the Persian Gulf region from her work for BBC World, but has also worked for Dubai Television.

BBC Radio
Her radio work included hosting BBC Radio Four's popular programme, Woman's Hour.

Features
Science and technology: Pakravan was anchor and reporter on the well-known BBC programme Tomorrow's World.
Health: she was anchor and presenter for the Channel Four programme Health Alert.
Comedy: in 1990, she made a cameo appearance as a comedic actress, appearing as an 'Indian woman' in the hit sit-com Drop the Dead Donkey.

Interviews
Arab World Direct, the programme Pakravan hosted, aired all over the Arab world - including Saudi Arabia - and had a special 9-11 edition, which featured an extended interview with Prince Abdullah bin Faisal bin Turki Al Saud, the former Governor of the Saudi Arabian General Investment Authority. Other high-profile interviews include Jordan's King Abdullah and the new UAE Vice President, Prime Minister and Ruler of Dubai, Sheikh Mohammed bin Rashid Al Maktoum.

Property
Around 2007 she began to run the 200-year-old Bridge Hotel, in Helmsdale, Sutherland, on the east coast of Scotland.

She was the General Manager at the Capital Club Bahrain between 2012 and 2014.

Personal
Pakravan has two adult daughters from her first marriage.

References

External links 
 

1950s births
BBC newsreaders and journalists
BBC World News
British Muslims
British people of Iranian descent
ITN newsreaders and journalists
Living people
People educated at Moreton Hall School